this article refers to the compilation album.  For the original recordings, see Jazz Sébastien Bach (Vol. 1) and Jazz Sébastien Bach Vol.2

Jazz Sebastian Bach is a compilation album / re-issue of music by the Paris-based Swingle Singers.  It combines the tracks from two previous releases, 1963's Bach's Greatest Hits a.k.a. Jazz Sébastien Bach (Vol. 1) (tracks 1–13) with 1968's Back to Bach a.k.a. Jazz Sébastien Bach Vol. 2 (tracks 14–23).

Track listing
all compositions by J.S. Bach
"Fugue in D Minor" from The Art of the Fugue – 2:14
"Prelude for Organ Chorale No 1" – 2:38
"Aria" from Suite No 3 in D – 3:17
"Prelude No 12 in F Minor" from The Well-Tempered Clavier, Book II (WTC II)" – 2:12
"Bourrée II" from The English Suite No 2" – 1:44
"Fugue No 2 in C Minor" (WTC I) – 1:16
"Fugue No 5 in D" (WTC I) – 1:38
"Prelude No 9 in E" (WTC II) – 3:19
"Sinfonia" from The Partita No 2 – 4:54
"Prelude No 1 in C" (WTC II) – 1:56
"Canon" – 1:53
"Two Part Invention No 1 in C" – 1:22
"Fugue No 5 in D" (WTC II) – 3:15
"Vivace" from Concerto for 2 violins, strings & continuo in D minor ("Double"), BWV 1043 – 3:19
"Prelude and Fugue, for keyboard No. 10 in E minor" (WTC I), BWV 855 (BC L89) – 3:01
"Choral" from Cantata No. 147, "Herz und Mund und Tat und Leben," BWV 147 (BC A174) – 3:28
"Gavotte" from Partita for solo violin No. 3 in E major, BWV 1006 – 2:30
"Prelude and Fugue, for keyboard No. 1 in C major" (WTC I), BWV 846 (BC L80) – 3:22
"Fugue" from Prelude and Fugue, for organ in G major, BWV 541 (BC J22) – 3:19
"Adagio" from Sonata for violin & keyboard No. 3 in E major, BWV 1016 – 3:56
"Prelude and Fugue, for keyboard No. 3 in C sharp major" (WTC I), BWV 848 (BC L82) – 3:18
"Prelude" from "Nun komm der Heiden Heiland" (II), chorale prelude for organ (Achtzehn Choräle No. 8), BWV 659 (BC K82) – 3:30
"Fugue" for keyboard No. 21 in B flat major" (WTC I), BWV 866 (BC L100) – 1:24

Personnel
Vocals:
Jeanette Baucomont – soprano
Christiane Legrand – soprano
Claudine Meunier – alto
Anne Germain – alto  (tracks 1 - 13)
Hélène Devos – alto (tracks 14 - 23)
Ward Swingle – tenor, arranger
Claude Germain – tenor  (tracks 1 - 13)
Joseph Noves – tenor (tracks 14 - 23)
Jean Cussac – bass
Jean Claude Briodin – bass (tracks 1 - 13)
Jose Germain – bass (tracks 14 - 23)
Rhythm section:
Pierre Michelot – double bass (tracks 1 - 13)
Guy Pedersen – double bass (tracks 14 - 23)
Gus Wallez or Andre Arpino – drums (tracks 1 - 13)
Bernard Lubat or Daniel Humair – drums (tracks 14 - 23)

References / external links
Philips 8247032 / Verve 824703

The Swingle Singers albums
2000 compilation albums
Arrangements of compositions by Johann Sebastian Bach
Philips Records albums